Peter Gabriel Burgoyne (born 29 January 1978) is a former Australian rules footballer with Port Adelaide in the Australian Football League (AFL). He played primarily in midfield and on the half back flank.

Early life
Burgoyne is of Indigenous Australian descent with tribal ancestry that can be traced to the Kokatha (Nunga) in South Australia. He grew up in the Northern Territory and began playing football with St Mary's in the Northern Territory Football League (NTFL). He is the elder brother of former Hawthorn and Port Adelaide player, Shaun Burgoyne and is the son of former Port Adelaide player Peter Burgoyne, Snr.

AFL career

Early career
Beginning his AFL career with the inaugural Port Adelaide side to enter the AFL, Burgoyne became well regarded for his performance as an attacking midfielder. He was selected from the Port Adelaide side in the South Australian National Football League (SANFL) in their changeover from the SANFL to the AFL.

Success
Honours include being selected as part of the International rules series in 1999 and was a vital part of Port's premiership side of 2004. Burgoyne was also named in the Indigenous Team of the Century. Despite being selected for and representing South Australia in the final State of Origin game against Victoria in 1999, Burgoyne was not technically eligible under the existing rules, having resided in the Northern Territory and not South Australia for the majority of his life between the ages of 10 and 17.

Twilight career
In 2007 Burgoyne made a highly successful transition to the half back flank, following an injury-riddled 2006 in his usual midfield role, and finished third in the club's Best and Fairest count. His finals series was also acknowledged with the Power's 'Best Finals Player' award.

Retirement
Burgoyne retired at the end of the 2009 season. He and team-mate Brendon Lade, the last remaining members of Port Adelaide's inaugural AFL team, both played their final games in round 22, 2009.

Playing statistics

|-
|- style="background-color: #EAEAEA"
! scope="row" style="text-align:center" | 1997
|style="text-align:center;"|
| 26 || 15 || 12 || 14 || 92 || 49 || 141 || 21 || 16 || 0.8 || 0.9 || 6.1 || 3.3 || 9.4 || 1.4 || 1.1
|-
! scope="row" style="text-align:center" | 1998
|style="text-align:center;"|
| 26 || 10 || 10 || 7 || 85 || 29 || 114 || 20 || 13 || 1.0 || 0.7 || 8.5 || 2.9 || 11.4 || 2.0 || 1.3
|- style="background-color: #EAEAEA"
! scope="row" style="text-align:center" | 1999
|style="text-align:center;"|
| 26 || 20 || 11 || 13 || 267 || 155 || 422 || 66 || 37 || 0.6 || 0.7 || 13.4 || 7.8 || 21.1 || 3.3 || 1.9
|-
! scope="row" style="text-align:center" | 2000
|style="text-align:center;"|
| 7 || 21 || 23 || 19 || 265 || 98 || 363 || 80 || 53 || 1.1 || 0.9 || 12.6 || 4.7 || 17.3 || 3.8 || 2.5
|- style="background-color: #EAEAEA"
! scope="row" style="text-align:center" | 2001
|style="text-align:center;"|
| 7 || 22 || 30 || 18 || 247 || 135 || 382 || 98 || 57 || 1.4 || 0.8 || 11.2 || 6.1 || 17.4 || 4.5 || 2.6
|-
! scope="row" style="text-align:center" | 2002
|style="text-align:center;"|
| 7 || 24 || 41 || 15 || 263 || 130 || 393 || 96 || 82 || 1.7 || 0.6 || 11.0 || 5.4 || 16.4 || 4.0 || 3.4
|- style="background-color: #EAEAEA"
! scope="row" style="text-align:center" | 2003
|style="text-align:center;"|
| 7 || 20 || 22 || 19 || 301 || 125 || 426 || 91 || 76 || 1.1 || 1.0 || 15.1 || 6.3 || 21.3 || 4.6 || 3.8
|-
! scope="row" style="text-align:center;" | 2004
|style="text-align:center;"|
| 7 || 23 || 12 || 11 || 283 || 201 || 484 || 54 || 75 || 0.5 || 0.5 || 12.3 || 8.7 || 21.0 || 2.3 || 3.3
|- style="background-color: #EAEAEA"
! scope="row" style="text-align:center" | 2005
|style="text-align:center;"|
| 7 || 19 || 11 || 8 || 245 || 144 || 389 || 53 || 50 || 0.6 || 0.4 || 12.9 || 7.6 || 20.5 || 2.8 || 2.6
|-
! scope="row" style="text-align:center" | 2006
|style="text-align:center;"|
| 7 || 10 || 5 || 6 || 112 || 90 || 202 || 24 || 20 || 0.5 || 0.6 || 11.2 || 9.0 || 20.2 || 2.4 || 2.0
|- style="background-color: #EAEAEA"
! scope="row" style="text-align:center" | 2007
|style="text-align:center;"|
| 7 || 24 || 8 || 11 || 389 || 222 || 611 || 88 || 70 || 0.3 || 0.5 || 16.2 || 9.3 || 25.5 || 3.7 || 2.9
|-
! scope="row" style="text-align:center" | 2008
|style="text-align:center;"|
| 7 || 17 || 4 || 4 || 253 || 175 || 428 || 66 || 40 || 0.2 || 0.2 || 14.9 || 10.3 || 25.2 || 3.9 || 2.4
|- style="background-color: #EAEAEA"
! scope="row" style="text-align:center" | 2009
|style="text-align:center;"|
| 7 || 15 || 4 || 3 || 195 || 161 || 356 || 39 || 43 || 0.3 || 0.2 || 13.0 || 10.7 || 23.7 || 2.6 || 2.9
|- class="sortbottom"
! colspan=3| Career
! 240
! 193
! 148
! 2997
! 1714
! 4711
! 796
! 632
! 0.8
! 0.6
! 12.5
! 7.1
! 19.6
! 3.3
! 2.6
|}

See also
After the siren kicks in Australian rules football

References

External links

Indigenous Australian players of Australian rules football
1978 births
Living people
Port Adelaide Football Club players
Port Adelaide Football Club Premiership players
Port Adelaide Football Club players (all competitions)
Port Adelaide Magpies players
South Australian State of Origin players
St Mary's Football Club (NTFL) players
Australian rules footballers from the Northern Territory
Port Adelaide Football Club (SANFL) players
Australia international rules football team players
North Heidelberg Football Club players
One-time VFL/AFL Premiership players
Australian rules footballers from South Australia